The Horticultural Products (Emergency Customs Duties) Act 1931 (22 & 23 Geo. V c. 3) was an Act of the British Parliament passed in late 1931 which gave the Minister of Agriculture the power to impose or raise import duties on fresh fruits, flowers and vegetables.

Notes

United Kingdom Acts of Parliament 1931
Economic history of the United Kingdom
1930s economic history
Horticulture in the United Kingdom